In mathematics, the Grothendieck group, or group of differences, of a commutative monoid  is a certain abelian group. The Grothendieck group construction takes its name from a specific case in category theory, introduced by Alexander Grothendieck in his proof of the Grothendieck–Riemann–Roch theorem, which resulted in the development of K-theory. This specific case is the monoid of isomorphism classes of objects of an abelian category, with the direct sum as its operation.

Grothendieck group of a commutative monoid

Motivation

In particular, in the case of a monoid operation denoted multiplicatively that has a zero element satisfying  for every  the Grothendieck group must be the trivial group (group with only one element), since one must have 

for every .

Universal property
Let M be a commutative monoid. Its Grothendieck group is an abelian group K with a monoid homomorphism  satisfying the following universal property: for any monoid homomorphism  from M to an abelian group A, there is a unique group homomorphism  such that 

This expresses the fact that any abelian group A that contains a homomorphic image of M will also contain a homomorphic image of K, K being the "most general" abelian group containing a homomorphic image of M.

Explicit constructions

To construct the Grothendieck group K of a commutative monoid M, one forms the Cartesian product .

.

The equivalence class of the element (m1, m2) is denoted by [(m1, m2)]. One defines K to be the set of equivalence classes. Since the addition operation on M × M is compatible with our equivalence relation, one obtains an addition on K, and K becomes an abelian group. The identity element of K is [(0, 0)], and the inverse of [(m1, m2)] is [(m2, m1)]. The homomorphism  sends the element m to [(m, 0)].

(Here +′ and −′ denote the addition and subtraction in the free abelian group  while + denotes the addition in the monoid M.) This construction has the advantage that it can be performed for any semigroup M and yields a group which satisfies the corresponding universal properties for semigroups, i.e. the "most general and smallest group containing a homomorphic image of M&hairsp;". This is known as the "group completion of a semigroup" or "group of fractions of a semigroup".

Properties
In the language of category theory, any universal construction gives rise to a functor; one thus obtains a functor from the category of commutative monoids to the category of abelian groups which sends the commutative monoid M to its Grothendieck group K. This functor is left adjoint to the forgetful functor from the category of abelian groups to the category of commutative monoids.

For a commutative monoid M, the map i : M → K is injective if and only if M has the cancellation property, and it is bijective if and only if M is already a group.

Example: the integers
The easiest example of a Grothendieck group is the construction of the integers  from the (additive) natural numbers .
First one observes that the natural numbers (including 0) together with the usual addition indeed form a commutative monoid  Now when one uses the Grothendieck group construction one obtains the formal differences between natural numbers as elements n − m and one has the equivalence relation

Now define

This defines the integers . Indeed, this is the usual construction to obtain the integers from the natural numbers. See "Construction" under Integers for a more detailed explanation.

Example: the positive rational numbers
Similarly, the Grothendieck group of the multiplicative commutative monoid  (starting at 1) consists of formal fractions  with the equivalence 
 for some 
which of course can be identified with the positive rational numbers.

Example: the Grothendieck group of a manifold
The Grothendieck group is the fundamental construction of K-theory. The group  of a compact manifold M is defined to be the Grothendieck group of the commutative monoid of all isomorphism classes of vector bundles of finite rank on M with the monoid operation given by direct sum. This gives a contravariant functor from manifolds to abelian groups. This functor is studied and extended in topological K-theory.

Example: The Grothendieck group of a ring
The zeroth algebraic K group  of a (not necessarily commutative) ring R is the Grothendieck group of the monoid consisting of isomorphism classes of finitely generated projective modules over R, with the monoid operation given by the direct sum. Then  is a covariant functor from rings to abelian groups.

The two previous examples are related: consider the case where  is the ring of complex-valued smooth functions on a compact manifold M. In this case the projective R-modules are dual to vector bundles over M (by the Serre–Swan theorem).

Grothendieck group and extensions

Definition

Another construction that carries the name Grothendieck group is the following: Let R be a finite-dimensional algebra over some field k or more generally an artinian ring. Then define the Grothendieck group  as the abelian group generated by the set  of isomorphism classes of finitely generated R-modules and the following relations: For every short exact sequence

of R-modules, add the relation

This definition implies that for any two finitely generated R-modules M and N, because of the split short exact sequence

Examples

Let K be a field. Then the Grothendieck group  is an abelian group generated by symbols  for any finite-dimensional K-vector space V. In fact,  is isomorphic to  whose generator is the element .

Since any short exact sequence of vector spaces splits, it holds that . In fact, for any two finite-dimensional vector spaces V and W the following holds:

The above equality hence satisfies the condition of the symbol  in the Grothendieck group.

Note that any two isomorphic finite-dimensional K-vector spaces have the same dimension. Also, any two finite-dimensional K-vector spaces V and W of same dimension are isomorphic to each other. The observation from the previous paragraph hence proves the following equation:

More generally, let  be the set of integers. The Grothendieck group  is an abelian group generated by symbols  for any finitely generated abelian groups A. One first notes that any finite abelian group G satisfies that . The following short exact sequence holds, where the map  is multiplication by n.

The exact sequence implies that , so every cyclic group has its symbol equal to 0. This in turn implies that every finite abelian group G satisfies  by the fundamental theorem of finite abelian groups. 

Furthermore, the rank of the abelian group satisfies the conditions of the symbol  of the Grothendieck group. Suppose one has the following short exact sequence of abelian groups:

Then tensoring with the rational numbers  implies the following equation.

Since the above is a short exact sequence of -vector spaces, the sequence splits. Therefore, one has the following equation.

On the other hand, one also has the following relation; for more information, see Rank of an abelian group.

Therefore, the following equation holds:

Universal Property

The Grothendieck group satisfies a universal property.

By choosing a suitable basis and writing the corresponding matrices in block triangular form one easily sees that character functions are additive in the above sense. By the universal property this gives us a "universal character"  such that .

In the modular representation theory of finite groups,  can be a field  the algebraic closure of the finite field with p elements. In this case the analogously defined map that associates to each -module its Brauer character is also a natural isomorphism  onto the ring of Brauer characters. In this way Grothendieck groups show up in representation theory.

This universal property also makes  the 'universal receiver' of generalized Euler characteristics. In particular, for every bounded complex of objects in 

one has a canonical element

In fact the Grothendieck group was originally introduced for the study of Euler characteristics.

Grothendieck groups of exact categories
A common generalization of these two concepts is given by the Grothendieck group of an exact category . Simply put, an exact category is an additive category together with a class of distinguished short sequences A → B → C. The distinguished sequences are called "exact sequences", hence the name. The precise axioms for this distinguished class do not matter for the construction of the Grothendieck group.

The Grothendieck group is defined in the same way as before as the abelian group with one generator [M&hairsp;] for each (isomorphism class of) object(s) of the category  and one relation

for each exact sequence

.

Alternatively and equivalently, one can define the Grothendieck group using a universal property: A map  from  into an abelian group X is called "additive" if for every exact sequence  one has ; an abelian group G together with an additive mapping  is called the Grothendieck group of  iff every additive map  factors uniquely through .

Every abelian category is an exact category if one just uses the standard interpretation of "exact". This is really abelian because R was assumed to be artinian (and hence noetherian) in the previous section.

On the other hand, every additive category is also exact if one declares those and only those sequences to be exact that have the form  with the canonical inclusion and projection morphisms.

Grothendieck groups of triangulated categories
Generalizing even further it is also possible to define the Grothendieck group for triangulated categories. The construction is essentially similar but uses the relations [X] − [Y] + [Z] = 0 whenever there is a distinguished triangle X → Y → Z → X[1].

Further examples
 In the abelian category of finite-dimensional vector spaces over a field k, two vector spaces are isomorphic if and only if they have the same dimension. Thus, for a vector space V 

 

Moreover, for an exact sequence

m = l + n, so

Thus 

where  is the standard Euler characteristic defined by

 For a ringed space , one can consider the category  of all locally free sheaves over X.  is then defined as the Grothendieck group of this exact category and again this gives a functor.

 For a ringed space , one can also define the category  to be the category of all coherent sheaves on X. This includes the special case (if the ringed space is an affine scheme) of  being the category of finitely generated modules over a noetherian ring R. In both cases  is an abelian category and a fortiori an exact category so the construction above applies.

In fact, both groups are isomorphic to the free abelian group generated by the isomorphism classes of simple R-modules.

 There is another Grothendieck group  of a ring or a ringed space which is sometimes useful. The category in the case is chosen to be the category of all quasi-coherent sheaves on the ringed space which reduces to the category of all modules over some ring R in case of affine schemes.  is not a functor, but nevertheless it carries important information.

 Since the (bounded) derived category is triangulated, there is a Grothendieck group for derived categories too. This has applications in representation theory for example. For the unbounded category the Grothendieck group however vanishes. For a derived category of some complex finite-dimensional positively graded algebra there is a subcategory in the unbounded derived category containing the abelian category A of finite-dimensional graded modules whose Grothendieck group is the q-adic completion of the Grothendieck group of A.

See also
 Field of fractions
 Localization
 Topological K-theory
 Atiyah–Hirzebruch spectral sequence for computing topological K-theory

References

 Michael F. Atiyah, K-Theory, (Notes taken by D.W.Anderson, Fall 1964), published in 1967, W.A. Benjamin Inc., New York.
 .
 
 
 The Grothendieck Group of Algebraic Vector Bundles; Calculations of Affine and Projective Space
 Grothendieck Group of a Smooth Projective Complex Curve

Algebraic structures
Homological algebra
K-theory